"Cheerful Little Earful" is a 1930 song composed by Harry Warren, with lyrics by Ira Gershwin and Billy Rose.  It was written for the musical Sweet and Low (1930). Actress and singer Fanny Brice, who was married to Billy Rose at the time, starred in Sweet and Low, where she and George Jessel sang the song. The actress Hannah Williams was known in particular for the song, "Cheerful Little Earful" in which she also performed in the Broadway production of Sweet and Low.

As the last line of each stanza notes, the "cheerful little earful" is "the well known 'I love you.'"

The piece became popular outside of the show and was recorded in several forms.

Notable recordings
Tom Gerun & His Orchestra - a Brunswick recording (catalog 4971) which was popular in 1930.
Chick Bullock - recorded on December 9, 1930 for Perfect Records (catalog No. 12675).
Fred Rich & His Orchestra (vocal by Smith Ballew) - recorded on November 19, 1930 for Parlophone Records (catalog No. 34157). 
Seger Ellis & His Orchestra - Recorded in New York, 15 December 1930 for Columbia Records (catalog No. 2362D).
Russ Morgan & His Orchestra - recorded for Decca Records (catalog No. 23993) on August 22, 1944.
Ella Fitzgerald - Get Happy! (Verve, 1959).
The Hawaiian Duces - an Angelus-Electrobeam release (catalog 3301-B) 1930.

References

External links
Lyrics at HarryWarren.org

Songs with lyrics by Ira Gershwin
1930 songs
Songs with lyrics by Billy Rose
Songs with music by Harry Warren
Songs from musicals